Sir Charles Blair Gordon, GBE (22 November 186730 July 1939) was a Canadian banker, manufacturer and diplomat.

Life and career
Educated at the High School of Montreal, Gordon founded the Standard Shirt Company, organized Dominion Textile in 1904, and in 1909 became president of Dominion Glass Company Limited, which was later known as Domglas. In 1913, he was appointed a director of the Bank of Montreal, and in 1927 became the bank's president.

From 1918 to 1921, he was Acting Chairman (Canadian War Mission) to the United States of America in Washington. In 1917, for his contributions, he was made a Knight Commander of the Order of the British Empire, and in 1918 was promoted to Knight Grand Cross of the order.

Gordon was one of the founders of the Town of Hampstead, Quebec

References

External links 
 
 Foreign Affairs and International Trade Canada Complete List of Posts

Canadian diplomats
Canadian bankers
1867 births
1939 deaths
Canadian Knights Grand Cross of the Order of the British Empire
High School of Montreal alumni
People from Hampstead, Quebec